Nazaqat is a novel written by author Harsh Agarwal. Nazaqat was published in 2013 by Half Baked Beans under the pen name of Sasha H Singhal.

Plot

The story of Nazaqat is about a girl Naazani, who gets into sex work and takes the name Nazaqat. She eventually fought to legalize prostitution in India.

Reception 

Aparna Mudi from Zee news wrote about the book, " The writing is crisp, but the end seems hurried – it could have made a more lyrical finish to keep the high that Singhal maintains throughout the book." Sankalpita Singh at Metro India said, "The book is written beautifully with the characters, the drama, the action woven so intricately yet so vividly. Though the book is very good, there is definitely scope of improvement in terms of plot." Lucknow Tribune published, "The book attempts to make a rather powerful statement on women empowerment through the life of a high-end escort Nazaqat."

The author

Harsh Agarwal is an author whose other books include An Excursion of Insight and Life in a Nutshell. He is also credited for films Mind Mera Mind and Vaidya.

References 

2013 Indian novels
Indian thriller novels